Takmak Fort is located in Palghar taluka of Palghar district in Maharashtra. The fort is situated on a north-south hill spur ending in a steep rise. The fort is in a ruined state with few remains of fortification. For some time, this fort was in the possession of the Portuguese and it was captured by Maratha army after the Battle of Vasai in 1739. It was captured by British Army in 1817.

How to reach
The fort is accessible in all seasons. It takes about three hours to reach the fort entrance from the base village Sakwar. The trek route starts from the Ramkrishna Mission situated on the National Highway 48. The trek path passes along the narrow spur running north until the scarp, where it is steep. It takes another 30 minutes on an average to visit the entire fort.

Places to see
There is a cannon in good condition, however the rest of the fortification is ruined. There are few rock cut cisterns and remains of buildings on the fort.

See also 
 List of forts in Maharashtra
 List of forts in India
 Marathi People

References 

 Forts in Palghar district
Tourist attractions in Palghar district